Shahad (could be spelled as Shahd or Shahed) is an Arabic feminine given name, which means "pure honey".  The name may refer to:
As a given name
Shahed Ahmed, English footballer
Shahed Ali, Bangladeshi author
Shahd Alshammari, Kuwaiti academic
Shahd Barmada (born 1988), singer
Shahad Budebs, Emirati footballer
Shahed Chowdhury, Bangladeshi director
Abu Shahed Emon, Bangladeshi director
Shahed Sharif Khan, Bangladeshi actor
Shahad Mubarak, Emirati long jumper
Shahed Ali Patwary, Bangladeshi politician
Shahad Al Rawi, Iraqi author
As a surname
Abdul-Ghani Shahad, Iraqi football coach
Husne Ara Shahed, Bangladeshi author
Salim Shahed, Bangladeshi cricketer
Shahedul Alam Shahed, Bangladeshi footballer
Syed Mohammad Shahed, Bangladeshi academic

References

Arabic feminine given names